Greigia cochabambae is a plant species in the genus Greigia. This species is endemic to Bolivia.

References

cochabambae
Flora of Bolivia